Henrieta Nagyová won in the final 6–4, 3–6, 7–6 against Olga Barabanschikova.

Seeds
A champion seed is indicated in bold text while text in italics indicates the round in which that seed was eliminated.

  Henrieta Nagyová (champion)
  Sabine Appelmans (first round)
  Sarah Pitkowski (first round)
  Florencia Labat (semifinals)
  Tatiana Panova (first round)
  Anna Smashnova (quarterfinals)
  Olga Barabanschikova (final)
  Kristie Boogert (first round)

Draw

External links
 1998 ENKA Open Draw

ENKA Open
1998 WTA Tour